Jiří Jech (born December 22, 1975) is a Czech football referee. He was a full international for FIFA from 2007 to 2010, and served as a referee in 2010 World Cup qualifiers.

Career statistics
Statistics for Gambrinus liga matches only.

References

External links
 Jiří Jech at WorldReferee.com
 Jiří Jech at WorldFootball.net

1975 births
Living people
Czech football referees